The 2014 Missouri Tigers football team (also called "Mizzou") represented the University of Missouri in the 2014 NCAA Division I FBS football season. It was the Tigers' third season as a member of the Southeastern Conference (SEC) in the Eastern Division. The team was led by head coach Gary Pinkel, who was in his 14th year, and played its home games at Faurot Field in Columbia, Missouri. They finished the season 11–3, 7–1 in SEC play to be champions of the Eastern Division. They represented the Eastern Division in the SEC Championship Game where they lost to Western Division champions Alabama 13–42. They were invited to the Citrus Bowl where they defeated Minnesota 33–17.

Recruits
Key losses:

 Henry Josey, junior tailback (declared for the 2014 NFL Draft), on January 7.
 Kony Ealy, junior defensive end (declared for the 2014 NFL Draft), on January 3.
 Dorial Green-Beckham, junior wide receiver (dismissed from team), on April 11.
 QB James Franklin
 WR L'Damian Washington
 WR Marcus Lucas
 WR Jaleel Clark
 TE Eric Waters
 OL Max Copeland
 OL Justin Britt
 DE Michael Sam
 LB Donovan Bonner
 CB E. J. Gaines
 CB Randy Ponder
 FS Matt White

2014 MO Tigers football team commits (28), 02/05/14 
https://twitter.com/mizzoufootball

28 recruits signed their National Letter of Intent on February 5, the National Signing Period.

Missouri's low recruit rankings are similar to past classes. Football is a copycat business, and Missouri's ability to recruit under-the-radar prospects and develop them have caught on with other teams around the nation.

Schedule

Schedule , as of December 8, 2013 (Retrieved: January 7, 2014)

Game summaries

South Dakota State

Toledo

Central Florida

Indiana

South Carolina

Georgia

Florida

Vanderbilt

Kentucky

Texas A&M

Tennessee

Arkansas

Alabama

Minnesota (Citrus Bowl)

Coaching staff

Source: 2014 Mizzou Football Roster (coaches)

Roster

Rankings

References

Missouri
Missouri Tigers football seasons
Citrus Bowl champion seasons
Missouri Tigers football